USS Hobo II (SP-783) was a United States Navy patrol vessel in commission from 1917 to 1919.

Hobo II was built in 1905 as a private motorboat of the same name by the Electric Launch Company (ELCO) at Bayonne, New Jersey. On 23 June 1917, the U.S. Navy acquired her from her owner, J. S. Melcher of New York City, for use as a section patrol boat during World War I. She was commissioned at Boston, Massachusetts, as USS Hobo II (SP-783) on 24 August 1917.

Assigned to the 1st Naval District in northern New England, Hobo II initially was based at Bar Harbor, Maine, where she operated on harbor patrol duties. On 21 January 1918 she was transferred to Boston, where she performed dispatch boat and general patrol duties for the rest of World War I and into 1919.

Hobo II was returned to Melcher on 17 February 1919.

References

SP-783 Hobo II at Department of the Navy Naval History and Heritage Command Online Library of Selected Images: U.S. Navy Ships -- Listed by Hull Number "SP" #s and "ID" #s -- World War I Era Patrol Vessels and other Acquired Ships and Craft numbered from SP-700 through SP-799
NavSource Online: Section Patrol Craft Photo Archive Hobo II (SP 783)

Patrol vessels of the United States Navy
World War I patrol vessels of the United States
Ships built in Bayonne, New Jersey
1905 ships